Giacomo Vincenti (died 1619) was an Italian bookseller and music printer from Venice. He also spelled his name Vincenci and Vincenzi. He started printing in 1583. His partner was Ricciardo Amadino, and between 1583 and 1586 they printed about twenty books a year, mostly editions of music. Although their official partnership ended in 1586 they continued to use the same typefaces, collaborated on some editions, and held joint copyrights in others. In 1587, Vincenti published Luca Marenzio's Fourth Book of Madrigals, with the composer's dedication. 

Vincenti did have competition, including the firms of Gardano, Scotto and Amadino; however his productions were more wide-ranging. He did not publish many non-musical works. He was one of the first music publishers to publish a trade list, which frequently included prices. Vincenti used the moveable type technique of printing, however, his editions are not regarded as particularly beautiful, although they tend to be accurate.

Vincenti published the works of most of the major north Italian composers, including:
Giovanni Croce (55 editions)
Lodovico Grossi da Viadana (53)
Luca Marenzio
Giammateo Asola
Adriano Banchieri (both his compositions and treatises)
Stefano Bernardi
Antonio Cifra
Alessandro Grandi
Felice Anerio
Girolamo Diruta (and treatises)
Ignazio Donati
Ruggiero Giovannelli
Giulio Caccini (reprint of Le nuove musiche and Euridice)

As well as musical treatises by people such as:
Giovanni Bassano
Riccardo Rognoni
Giovanni Battista Bovicelli
Giovanni Battista Spadi
Bernardino Bottazzi
Giovanni Artusi (including L’Artusi, overo Delle imperfettioni della moderna musica, which was important in the debate between Artusi and Claudio Monteverdi)
Romano Micheli

References
Thomas W. Bridges. "Giacomo Vincenti", Grove Music Online, ed. L. Macy (accessed May 20, 2006), grovemusic.com  (subscription access).

Notes

Republic of Venice printers
Sheet music publishers (people)
Italian music publishers (people)
16th-century Venetian people
17th-century Venetian people
16th-century births
1619 deaths